Shahid Modarres (also Romanized as Shahīd Modarres) is a village in Esmailabad Rural District, in the Central District of Khash County, Sistan and Baluchestan Province, Iran. At the 2006 census, its population was 205, in 35 families.

References 

Populated places in Khash County